Bell Shoals Church is a Baptist megachurch located in Brandon, Florida. It is affiliated with the Southern Baptist Convention.

History 
Bell Shoals started in  February 1961 when a group of 17 men met at  Stowers Funeral Home. Shortly after, in March 1961, they acquired  of land to build their sanctuary, and 80 additional members joined.

Today, there are now 8,000 members and four other campuses. One of their campuses, Bell Shoals Baptist Apollo Beach, first started with 12 members, now has over 400 members.

In their community, Bell Shoals has partnered with Give 'em Heaven Ministries, Good Samaritan Mission, Manna on Wheels, Metropolitan Ministries, the Community Issues Council, Friends of Internationals, LifeCare Network, Tampa Port Ministries, Inc. and Workplace Paracletes.

The church also hosts concerts and large Christmas productions. In 2013, Bell Shoals hosted a concert featuring Natalie Grant and Sandi Patty. In December 2017, Bell Shoals hosted its annual Christmas production, which featured a 175-person choir and a 35-piece orchestra. In February 2018, Bell Shoals held a concert featuring American Idol finalists Scott MacIntyre and Jeremy Rosado to raise money to benefit victims of Hurricane Maria in Puerto Rico.

Politics 
In 2007, protests gathered around Bell Shoals Baptist Church and accused the church of discriminating against gay men and women. Forrest Pollock, then pastor of the church, denied these claims and invited the people to attend church.

References 

Megachurches in Florida
Baptist churches in Florida
Southern Baptist Convention churches
Churches in Hillsborough County, Florida